3–2–1 was a British game show that was made by Yorkshire Television for ITV. It ran for ten years, from 29 July 1978 to 24 December 1988, with Ted Rogers as the host.

It was based on a Spanish gameshow called Un, dos, tres... responda otra vez and was a trio of three shows in one: a quiz, variety and a game show.

The show was a huge success, consistently pulling in large ratings. The first series, though intended as a summer filler, attracted up to 16.5 million viewers and subsequent years never peaked below 12 million. The show occupied a Saturday early evening slot for most of its run.

The final Christmas special, broadcast on 24 December 1988, attracted 12.5 million viewers, but an eleventh series was not commissioned. Ted Rogers claimed in an April 1996 interview that "The Oxbridge lot got control of TV and they didn't really want it. It was too downmarket for them. We were still getting 12 million viewers when they took it off after ten years. These days if a show gets nine million everyone does a lap of honour."

The format
The overall objective of the game was to survive elimination through to part three of the show, and try to unravel a series of cryptic clues in order to win the star prize. However, one of the clues referred to "Dusty Bin," the show's booby prize; any contestants who wound up with Dusty at the end of the show received only a new dustbin. Each show had a theme, such as "Seacruise" or the "Swinging Sixties". All of the variety acts, quiz questions, stage sets and clues subsequently followed this theme. In later series, Dusty would appear at the start of the show dressed in a costume relating to that week's theme. The changing themes were dropped for the final series where a more generic stage set was re-used each week.

Part 1: The 1,000-to-1 quiz
In part one of the show, three couples had the chance to win up to £1,000 in the "1,000 to 1 quiz". The first round consisted of a maximum of 10 questions (in 30 seconds), each correct answer being worth £10 (or in the first series £1, but with three rounds available). Passes were permitted but there was no opportunity to return to the question. Each member of the couple answered in turn with the lady answering first and the first answer was given to her to avoid the possibility of a zero score, An incorrect answer, or the time limit, would immediately end the round. Each correct answer in the second round was worth the total amount scored in the first, hence the need to avoid a zero score which would have meant a couple were playing for nothing.

The questions were usually of the same 'word association' format. Ted Rogers would say, for example, an island and the contestants would have to name the country to which it belonged (e.g. Ted: "Gozo", Contestant: "Malta"). Another example would be people and their titles (e.g. Ted: "Elizabeth II", Contestant: "Queen").

In the first series, the winners of the quiz would return the following week to compete again, while the other two couples would progress to part two, but from the second series, this changed to the worst-performing couple being eliminated, taking home the money they won in the quiz and a ceramic model of Dusty Bin.

Dusty Bin was conceived as the booby prize by the show's producer Derek Burrell-Davis and created as a cartoon character by the designer and animator John Sunderland, who also designed the opening and end titles and the themed 'costumes' for Dusty Bin. Sunderland went on to design some of the most successful 'new-wave' populist museums in Britain, starting notably with the Jorvik Viking Centre in York, which like his dustbin became an overnight hit with the British public.

In the final series (1987–1988), the 1,000-to-1 quiz was replaced by a general-knowledge, fingers-on-buzzers quiz. As before, three couples participated, in just two rounds of questions. Each couple began with £10 and could earn another £10 for each correct answer in the first round.  The first round required ten correct answers (in other words, the round would not end if ten questions had been read out and not all answered correctly). As soon as Ted started to ask the question, the couple who hit the buzzer first, after Ted had said their name, had three seconds to answer the question, and if they failed to answer the question in three seconds, or answered the question wrong, Ted would say "On Offer" and the other two couples would have a chance to answer the question. Again, the couple who hit the buzzer first, after Ted had said their name, had three seconds to answer, and if they failed to answer the question in three seconds, or answer the question wrong, that question would go into the bin. Following the first round, Ted would give the couples a break, while, he introduced a "newcomer" to 3–2–1 (another addition to the final series). This was a chance for an act to perform, much like the later rounds as normal, though, the "newcomer" had never appeared on 3–2–1 before. Following the newcomer act, round two of the quiz would be played, with only fifteen questions been asked. As with previous series, whatever money the couples had after the first round would be the value of the question to them in the second round, and it was the same format for answering the questions. The maximum a couple could win in this round was £1,650 (as in the starting £10, ten first-round questions answered correctly plus all fifteen in the second round), however, this was never achieved. At the end of the two rounds of questions, the couple with the least money would leave with the money they'd won and their ceramic Dusty Bin, then they would go to the commercial break. On the 1987 Christmas special, the quiz only consisted of 20 £100 questions.

Part 2: The elimination
The elimination mechanism for reducing the remaining couples down to one changed over the course of the show. In the first two series, it was a physical game to fit in with the show's theme. This changed in 1981 to the contestants competing head to head in a computer game (such as Breakout), and was finally amended in 1982 to an elimination question which the last two couples would answer after seeing the first three variety acts in part two of the show. The commercial break followed the question, and in 1986 and 1987, a viewers' question was posed to win a colour television, with three runners up getting a ceramic Dusty Bin. The entry form for that was in that week's edition of TV Times.

Part 3: The acts and prize clues
In the early years, the third round was referred to as Take it or Leave it?. The final version of the show's format was amended in 1982 so that from the beginning of part two of the show, the two remaining couples from the quiz watched the first three variety acts together. At the end of each act, one of the performers would come over to the table and give Ted a clue object (or MacGuffin as Ted sometimes called them) and read a corresponding rhyme to provide clues for that particular prize.

After three acts, the couples would decide on which object they would like to reject in the hope that it was Dusty Bin and then take part in the final elimination question. The losers would leave with the money they had won in part one, their ceramic Dusty Bin and a consolation prize (such as a twelve-piece dinner service) and the winners would go through to part three of the show.

At the beginning of part three, Ted would decode the clue and reveal the prize which the final couple rejected before the end of part two. Another act would then perform and leave another clue, leaving three on the table. Ted would then re-read one of the earlier two clues, before the couple chose their second item to reject before that prize was then revealed to them. The final variety act would perform and leave a last clue. Ted would then re-read one of the previous clues and the couple would reject their third item, and another prize was then revealed. Ted would then re-read the remaining two clues and the couple would be faced with their final decision leaving them with the prize they have chosen and ultimately won, after seeing what the other prize they had rejected was, and also with the prize they had won, they had the money they won in part one of the show.  Unlike the eliminated couples, the winning couple did not receive a ceramic Dusty Bin, unless they had Dusty at the end of the show, all they got was a brand new dustbin, the money they won in part one and a ceramic Dusty Bin. As well as Dusty Bin, which was always one of the five prizes, the other four prizes normally included a car and a holiday. Later series sometimes featured two cars as prizes.

The clues became notorious for being almost impossibly difficult and obscure, having only a remote connection to the prizes, which contestants sometimes did not appear to grasp even after Ted had revealed it to them. It has often been suggested that the clues had more than one possible explanation, allowing the producers to control which prize the contestants received. Indeed, in one episode, Ted jokingly said to confused contestants, attempting to make a decision: "well, the rhymes could mean anything, as you know.".

‡For example, a wishbone brought on by Sonny Hayes came with the clue "Take one that never changes, add a pub and a precious stone, bring them all up-to-date, and now, you're on your own.", which the contestants rejected hoping it referred to Dusty Bin. Rogers' explanation of the clue was: "'Take one that never changes', well, that could be Dusty Bin which of course is where you might throw a wishbone. 'Add a pub and a precious stone', well, that doesn't point to Dusty. 'Bring them all up-to-date, and now you're on your own.'. Well, what about the wishbone? Sonny said 'a large wishbone', so what might a large wishbone come from? Something larger than a chicken. Turkey, maybe? Now, 'one that never changes.' is a constant, a pub can also be an inn, there's a lot of precious stones but how many go with 'constant inn'? How about opal? Yes, Constantinople, up to date, the pride of Turkey, you've rejected a 3–2–1 holiday!".

Acts who appeared on the show
The early series of the programme featured a regular cast of comedy performers including Chris Emmett, Mike Newman, Felix Bowness, Debbie Arnold and Duggie Brown. This format was changed for later series when each show featured a number of variety acts of the day as well as a house dance troupe such as the Brian Rogers Connection who would perform solos for the first act. They would later often dance behind the acts who would invariably top the bill. Previous dance/hostess troupes who appeared include Lipstick (choreographed by hostess Libby Roberts) and the Gentle Secs.

Other hostesses who appeared on the show include: Mireille Allonville, Jenny Layland, Patsy Ann Scott, Annie St John, Karen Palmer, Gail Playfair, Tula, Alison Temple-Savage, Libby Roberts, Fiona Curzon, Karan David, Wei Wei Wong, Caroline Munro and Lynda Lee Lewis.

Acts who appeared included: Gloria Gaynor, George Roper, Ken Dodd, Charlie Williams, Bonnie Langford, Duncan Norvelle, Black Lace, Bernie Winters, Stutz Bear Cats, Kit and the Widow, Wall Street Crash, Kiki Dee, Michael Ball, 'Nasty Nigel' Lythgoe, Martin "The Beast" Francis, Tom Pepper, Fay Presto, Pete Price, Manhattan Transfer, Shane Richie, the Flaming Hamsters, Stan Boardman, Fascinating Aida, Showaddywaddy, Kajagoogoo, Frankie Howerd, Colm Wilkinson, Wilfrid Brambell from Steptoe and Son, Sinitta, Five Star, Indigo Lady, Cheryl Baker, Phil Cornwell, Jaki Graham, Nana Mouskouri, the Chuckle Brothers, Brian Conley, Roy Walker, the Drifters, John Sparkes, Wayne Sleep, Andrew O'Connor, Gareth Hunt, Peter Beckett, Syd Lawrence (with his orchestra), Humphrey Lyttelton, Frankie Vaughan, Jessica Martin, the Foxes, Mud, Keith Harris and Orville, Mick Miller, Diane Solomon, Tony Christie, Cover Girls, Lyn Paul, the Searchers, the Rockin' Berries, Stephanie Lawrence, Don Lusher (with his band), Madeline Bell, Georgie Fame, Wayne Dobson, the Real Thing, Rebecca Storm, Richard Digance, Anna Dawson, Marion Montgomery, Bill Maynard, the Krankies, Terry Scott, Carmel McSharry, Bob Carolgees, Diana Dors, Lionel Blair, Alvin Stardust, Phil Cool, Vince Eager, Mike Reid, Nicholas Parsons, Sheila Steafel, Danny La Rue, Les Dennis, The Wurzels, Joan Benham, Ken Colyer (with his jazzmen), Frazer Hines, Charlie Williams, Pan's People (as Dee Dee Wilde's Pan's People), Rita Webb, The Great Soprendo, Bernard Bresslaw, Charlie Drake, Aimi MacDonald, Mark Heap (the Two Marks), Vince Hill and Paul Da Vinci.

As was the style of the day, the show often featured speciality acts such as a female singer who sang unconvincing renditions of popular songs whilst her male partner sketched caricatures of famous people connected with the song on a flip chart (e.g. a sketch of Marilyn Monroe was drawn whilst the Elton John song Candle in the Wind was performed) who were Trevillion and (Sadie) Nine. The other songs performed were Smile (Though, Your Heart is Breaking), Eye of the Tiger accompanied by sketches of Charlie Chaplin and a boxer. The prize announcers were: Anthony Schaeffer (1984–1985) and later John Benson (1986–87), who had provided the famous voice-over for Sale of the Century.

The Christmas editions of the show sometimes featured celebrities in place of regular contestants. The first Christmas show for 1978 (but broadcast in January 1979 due to industrial action at YTV) featured three celebrity partners, paired according to their nationality. The winners were Ireland's Terry Wogan and Clodagh Rodgers. The pair eliminated the five prizes available for charity, becoming the series' first contestants to end up with the dustbin prize and thus earn nothing at all for their charity, much to their embarrassment. The following years, members of the public were featured as the contestants as with the regular show, but in 1981, John Inman and Barbara Windsor were the winners and they too won the dustbin; but on this occasion, the prizes were all revealed to be 'junk' and the dustbin was in fact the star prize. Inman & Windsor were in on the set up and deliberately contrived to win the dustbin. However the 1983 Christmas edition featured children as contestants.

The DJ Janice Long appeared as a contestant on the very first episode with her then husband, Trevor, in July 1978

Hand gesture
Ted Rogers would regularly make a lightning fast 3–2–1 hand gesture. This became an important gimmick of the show – and a school playground favourite – mainly because, it was quite difficult to do, and resulted in a rude hand gesture if performed incorrectly. The correct way of doing the gesture is to hold up three fingers (index, middle, and ring) on the right hand, facing inward; two (index and middle) facing outward; and then one (index) facing inward, turning the wrist while changing the fingers.

Dusty Bin
Dusty Bin was both the show's mascot and its booby prize. Dusty would appear at the start of each show, dressed in the style of that week's theme, though, this did not occur in the 1987 series, as these programmes did not have a theme as per previous series.

The cartoon character of Dusty Bin was created by freelance designer John Sunderland, who developed the character based on the show producers' brief for a booby prize which would work on the British version of the show. The original Spanish version had a pumpkin as a booby prize. Sunderland's concept for the shows' original titles, which were shown on the original series, included the birth of the bin. The character came to life as Yorkshire Television's chevron logo falls to earth after shooting up into the sky like a rocket above the studios, exploding in a dustbin standing by the studio's stage door. The bin contained a clown's costume, parts of which become one with the bin, bringing it to life as the character Dusty Bin; part dustbin, part clown, part enduring iconic character.

The original robotic Dusty Bin, and his Yorkshire Terrier dog Garbage, was put together by Ian Rowley, in his converted chapel workshop in Rodley, Leeds. He used over 73 microprocessors, which was cutting edge 1980s remote control robotic technology in that day, at a cost around £10,000 to manufacture – which was a small fortune in those days – to control Dusty and Garbage, and in 151 shows, some of Dusty's & Garbage's antics included dressing up as a caveman and dinosaur, bullfighting as a matador and bull, dressing up as a baby, driving into the studio in a Ford Model T, juggling balls like a clown, playing the piano like Elton John, flying round the studio with a James Bond jetpack, escaping from chains like Harry Houdini, riding a bike, spraying Ted Rogers with paint and even driving a tank into the studio, to bomb the audience with confetti. There are three Dustys made in total, one which is fully robotic is with the creator Ian Rowley. Another is greeting people at the ITV studio entrance and the third is owned by Ted Rogers's son Danny.

In popular culture
In 1999, as part of their Christmas special entitled "The Phantom Millennium"; French and Saunders included Dusty Bin in a parody of Star Wars: Episode I – The Phantom Menace; where Dusty Bin played Droid DB-321. Dawn French makes the 3–2–1 "hand signal" whilst she commands the droid in the guise of Queen Amanana (A parody of Queen Amidala). Also, as part of Comic Relief 2007, the BBC showed a short sketch based around The Proclaimers' 1988 hit song "I'm Gonna be (500 Miles)". Directed by and starring Peter Kay, it featured Dusty Bin dancing with a gaggle of forgotten celebrities from the 1960s, 1970s and 1980s. The song was released as a CD single and DVD. Dusty also appeared briefly in a robot-themed chapter of the webcomic Scary Go Round.

The Class 321 trains were nicknamed 'Dusty Bins' due to the number bearing the same name as the game show, and class 153 unit number 153 321 is also affectionately known as 'Dusty Bin' by train crews because of its number. The Airbus A321 is also nicknamed 'Dusty Bin' due to the type bearing the same name as the show.

A 2001 episode of ChuckleVision entitled "Let's Get Quizzical" features Ted Rogers as a downmarket game show host. In one scene where the Chuckle Brothers are hiding from Rogers in two dustbin cans, Rogers shouts "Come back here with my dustbin!", possibly in reference to Rogers' association with 321 and Dusty Bin. Also in another scene where Rogers hosts the game show "Trophy's Cabinet" he begins with a small hand gesture, which is likely a parody of his famous 321 hand gesture.

The Burkiss Way, a radio comedy show which co-starred 3-2-1 regular Chris Emmett, parodied the show with a sketch involving a final clue of "It's a dustbin and not a car.", which was revealed to be an anagram of "It's a car and not a dustbin." and thus by rejecting it, the contestants had turned down winning a new car.

Another parody was performed on Russ Abbot's Madhouse, in which the show was named 1-2-3. The host - played by Les Dennis - presents as the final clue a suitcase and the rhyme: "I pack my bags to go on one, and stay in a nice hotel, and see the sun shine through the palm trees; this a travel agent might sell." The eager contestants (Russ Abbot and Bella Emberg) pick this prize, certain it will be the holiday... It turns out to be the bin.

In the Artic text adventure game "Planet of Death" that was made for all major 8 bit computers in the early 80s, 3-2-1 was a major clue towards the end of the game. When the character got past the force field, they entered a room that contained their ship and the lift that would take them off the planet. However, the lift is unpowered so on some further exploration the character comes across another room in which, there are 3 switches and the clue reads – "3,2,1 – No Dusty, Bin Rules.".

DVD game
An interactive DVD version of 3–2–1 was released by Universal in 2007. Hosted by Dusty Bin (though, Rogers appears in series clips used for the game), it offers both questions from original broadcasts and current ones.

The prizes
3–2–1 become notorious for the unconventional prizes it awarded to winners. For instance, couples only won a brand new metal dustbin if the final clue revealed was "Dusty Bin". A pet dog was also awarded (Episode 1 featured a St. Bernard and a year's supply of brandy. This was rejected by Janice Long and her then husband Trevor. Other less extravagant prizes have included: a sofa that turns into a pool table, gold nuggets, a share in a racehorse, a family set of folding bicycles, a year's supply of fish, and matching 'his and hers' sheepskin coats.

Transmissions

Series

Specials

References

External links

3–2–1 at BFI

1970s British game shows
1980s British game shows
1978 British television series debuts
1988 British television series endings
English-language television shows
ITV game shows
Television series by ITV Studios
Television series by Yorkshire Television